Meerssen is a town and a municipality in southeastern Netherlands.

History
The Treaty of Meerssen was signed in Meerssen in 870. The Treaty of Meerssen was an agreement of the division of the Carolingian Empire by the surviving sons of Louis I, Charles II of the West Franks and Louis the German of East Franks.

Around the middle of the 10th century the allodium Meerssen was the property of queen Gerberga, the daughter of king Henry I. She was the spouse of Louis IV of France. In 968 she donated all her property to the abbey of Saint Remigius in Reims.

Population centres

Transportation

Railway station: Meerssen

International relations

Twin towns - Sister cities
Meerssen is a founding member of the Douzelage, a town twinning association of 24 towns across the European Union. This active town twinning began in 1991 and there are regular events, such as a produce market from each of the other countries and festivals.  Discussions regarding membership are also in hand with three further towns (Agros in Cyprus, Škofja Loka in Slovenia, and Tryavna in Bulgaria).

Notable people 
 Charles Eyck (1897 in Meerssen - 1983) a Dutch visual artist
 Hubert Levigne (1905 in Meerssen - 1989) a Dutch artist
 Gerard Kockelmans (1925 in Meerssen - 1965) a Dutch composer, conductor and music teacher
 Jef Lahaye (1932 in Bunde – 1990) a Dutch professional racing cyclist
 Maria van der Hoeven (born 1949 in Meerssen) a retired Dutch politician
 Erik Meijer (born 1969 in Meerssen) a retired Dutch footballer with 462 club caps
 Kyara Stijns (born 1995 in Bunde) a Dutch professional racing cyclist

Gallery

References
Notes

External links 

Official website

 
Populated places in Limburg (Netherlands)
Municipalities of Limburg (Netherlands)
South Limburg (Netherlands)